David John Bright (born 29 November 1949 in England) is a former footballer who represented New Zealand gaining 8 A-international caps from 1979 to 1982.

Born in England, Bright emigrated to New Zealand in 1974 and made his first appearance for the All Whites in 1979 in a friendly against Norwich City and his first official match on 29 June 1979 in a 6–0 win over Fiji.

He was a member of the All Whites squad at the 1982 FIFA World Cup in Spain, where they lost to Scotland, USSR and Brazil.

Bright retired from international football after the World Cup, but returned to New Zealand to continue to play National League for Manurewa and, later, Papatoetoe, before turning his hand to coaching.

His son Kris Bright also represented New Zealand at international level.

References

External links

NZ 1982 World Cup

1949 births
Living people
1982 FIFA World Cup players
English footballers
English emigrants to New Zealand
Association football defenders
Naturalised citizens of New Zealand
New Zealand association footballers
New Zealand international footballers
Manurewa AFC players
Papatoetoe AFC players
Sittingbourne F.C. players
New Zealand expatriate sportspeople in England